The Ultra Colonsay is a Panamax bulk cargo carrier owned by Toei Japan. It was built as U-Sea Colonsay for Canpotex of Canada to transport potash between Canada and destinations in Asia. The ship made its maiden voyage in October 2011 from Japan to Vancouver; it is named after the Colonsay Potash Mine in Province of Saskatchewan, where some of the potash it carried originates.  This ship is one of nine vessels to be built for a joint venture operated by U-SEA and Canpotex. The vessel was built by Shin Kasado Dockyard.

References

2011 ships
Cargo ships
Merchant ships
Merchant ships of Panama